Jimione (Jimmie) Isimeli Samisoni was the Dean of the Fiji School of Medicine (FSM).

Biography
Samisoni attended Lelean Memorial School in 1949, passed his Senior Cambridge exams and matriculated to the then Central School of Medicine. The Central School of Medicine was later renamed the Fiji School of Medicine.

After receiving a fellowship from the World Health Organization, he went on to study at the Otago University where he graduated in 1959 with a Bachelor of Medicine. Later he continued post-graduate studies at the University of Queensland where he graduated with a Masters of Science degree.

Whilst studying for his Bachelor of Medicine and Bachelor of Surgery degree, Jimmie Samisoni was also working towards his Doctorate (PhD)which he received in 1973.

From the mid to late 1970s, Dr Samisoni worked as a house surgeon in Queensland. He also worked as a senior lecturer at the Griffith University before returning to Fiji in 1980 where he joined the Fiji School of Medicine.

During the year of the first military coup in Fiji (1987), Dr Jimmie Samisoni left Fiji and joined the University of Hawaii's medical faculty as an assistant clinical professor.

Dr Samisoni was appointed the academic dean of the Fiji School of Medicine when he came back to Fiji in 1990. He retired in 1998.

Dr Jimione Samisoni died in April 2007. He was married to Dr Mere Samisoni (DBA) and they had four children. DrMere Samisoni is the Chairperson of the popular Hot Bread chain of stores in Fiji.

References
 Dedicated to Science and Medicine - Dr Jimione Samisoni's life story by Dr Joji Malani, Fiji Times Online, 26 April 2007

2007 deaths
People educated at Lelean Memorial School
Fijian people of Rotuman descent
Year of birth missing
University of Otago alumni
University of Queensland alumni
University of Hawaiʻi faculty
Fijian medical doctors
Academic staff of the Fiji National University
Fijian expatriates in Australia
Fijian academic administrators
20th-century Fijian educators